The In-Betweener is a fictional character appearing in American comic books published by Marvel Comics.

Publication history

The character first appeared in Warlock #10 (Dec. 1975) and was created by Jim Starlin.

Fictional character biography
By the In-Betweener's own admission, he represents duality itself, specifically in respect to concepts such as good and evil, reason and emotion, truth and illusion, and life and death. The In-Betweener is also an agent of the conceptual beings Master Order and Lord Chaos, although his loyalty is usually to himself rather than to them. In addition to being an incarnation of balance and duality, the In-Betweener is possibly a metaphysical counterpart of Galactus.  

The hero Adam Warlock is the first Terran meta-human to encounter the In-Betweener, and the entity reveals that it is destined to force Warlock to transform into his villainous future self the Magus. Warlock, however, was able to escape this fate with help from the Titan Thanos. 

The In-Betweener then claims to be the power behind the plan to alter the fabric of reality orchestrated by the group of sorcerers known as the Creators, but secretly seeks to impose his own concept of balance upon the universe. After an encounter with the sorcerer Doctor Strange, the In-Betweener is imprisoned as punishment for rebelling against his masters. 

The In-Betweener later attempts to supplant Galactus' role in the universe and allies with the Elders of the Universe in their plan against Galactus. However, the In-Betweener betrays the Elders during a confrontation with the entity Death and compels Death to wipe three of the Elders from existence. Soon after this, the In-Betweener also battles Galactus and his robotic servant the Punisher, but the stalemated battle is interrupted by his masters, who subsequently imprison him.

He is later freed by Thanos, who secretly desires the Soul Gem the In-Betweener wears, as it is one of the six Infinity Gems. Thanos then steals the gem and abandons the In-Betweener to face the wrath of Master Order and Lord Chaos, who discover he has escaped his prison.

The In-Betweener later appeared as a pawn of the villain Scorpio, who is a member of the criminal organization Zodiac. Scorpio, however, was stopped by the superhero team the Avengers and the In-Betweener was subsequently freed.

The In-Betweener also appeared in an alternate dimension of Earth-957.

During the Time Runs Out storyline, the Beyonders are revealed to have killed Master Order, Lord Chaos and the In-Betweener as part of destroying abstract entities in each reality across the multiverse. However, the In-Betweener was later revealed to be the mastermind behind Libra's attempt at destroying Earth, and more specifically, Starbrand.

Not long after the universe was restored, Master Order and Lord Chaos took advantage of the fact that the cosmic hierarchy was not set anew and apparently kill the Living Tribunal. After committing the murder, they approached the In-Betweener and forced him to become the binding force that combined Master Order and Lord Chaos into a new cosmic being named Logos in order to take the Living Tribunal's place as the personification of multiversal law.

Powers and abilities
As the physical embodiment of the cosmic balance between Order and Chaos, the In-Betweener is able to manipulate cosmic energy to alter reality to achieve nearly any effect or ability within his influence as the synthesis of duality. He is, however, under the absolute control of Master Order and Lord Chaos as his creators. The In-Betweener's other major (and unique) ability is to analyze a target and then direct energy towards it in a "polar opposite" form, which is instantly fatal. 

Alternatively, if he cannot personally synthesize the "opposite energy" necessary to eliminate an opponent, he can directly summon that enemy's opposite being, and eliminate them that way; using the power granted to him in his station as a cosmic force, he once even summoned and forced Death itself to destroy the Elders of the Universe, even though it had, at an earlier point, refused to ever let them die again as a punishment. The In-Betweener finds that he is unable to use either of his special abilities on Galactus, however, and he believes that this is because he is Galactus's metaphysical counterpart and opposite.

References

External links
 In-Betweener at Marvel.com
 

Comics characters introduced in 1974
Characters created by Jim Starlin
Marvel Comics supervillains